is a Japanese footballer currently playing as a forward for Nagano Parceiro.

Club career
In 2022, Takakubo transferred to FC Tokushima on loan from AC Nagano Parceiro.

Career statistics

Club
.

Notes

References

1998 births
Living people
Sportspeople from Saitama Prefecture
Association football people from Saitama Prefecture
Chuo University alumni
Japanese footballers
Association football forwards
J3 League players
AC Nagano Parceiro players
FC Tokushima players